In mathematics, an operad is a structure that consists of abstract operations, each one having a fixed finite number of inputs (arguments) and one output, as well as a specification of how to compose these operations. An operad is to its algebras as a group is to its group representations.

History 
Operads originate in algebraic topology; they were introduced to characterize iterated loop spaces by J. Michael Boardman and Rainer M. Vogt in 1969 and by J. Peter May in 1970. The word "operad" was created by May as a portmanteau of "operations" and "monad" (and also because his mother was an opera singer).

Interest in operads was considerably renewed in the early 90s when, based on early insights of Maxim Kontsevich, Victor Ginzburg and Mikhail Kapranov discovered that some duality phenomena in rational homotopy theory could be explained using Koszul duality of operads. Operads have since found many applications, such as in deformation quantization of Poisson manifolds, the Deligne conjecture, or graph homology in the work of Maxim Kontsevich and Thomas Willwacher.

Intuition 
Suppose  is a set and for  we define

,

Definition

Non-symmetric operad
A non-symmetric operad (sometimes called an operad without permutations, or a non- or plain operad) consists of the following:
 a sequence  of sets, whose elements are called -ary operations,
 an element  in  called the identity,

satisfying the following coherence axioms:
 identity: 
 associativity:

Symmetric operad

equivariance: given a permutation ,
 
and given  permutations ,

The permutation actions in this definition are vital to most applications, including the original application to loop spaces.

Morphisms 
A morphism of operads  consists of a sequence

that:
 preserves the identity: 
 preserves composition: for every n-ary operation  and operations ,
 
 preserves the permutation actions: .

In other categories 
So far operads have only been considered in the category of sets. More generally, it is possible to define operads in any symmetric monoidal category C . In that case, each  is an object of C, the composition  is a morphism  in C (where  denotes the tensor product of the monoidal category), and the actions of the symmetric group elements are given by isomorphisms in C.

A common example is the category of topological spaces and continuous maps, with the monoidal product given by the cartesian product. In this case, a topological operad is given by a sequence of spaces (instead of sets) . The structure maps of the operad (the composition and the actions of the symmetric groups) are then assumed to be continuous. The result is called a topological operad. Similarly, in the definition of a morphism of operads, it would be necessary to assume that the maps involved are continuous.

Other common settings to define operads include, for example, modules over a commutative ring, chain complexes, groupoids (or even the category of categories itself), coalgebras, etc.

Algebraist definition 

Similarly, a symmetric operad can be defined as a monoid object in the category of -objects, where  means a symmetric group. A monoid object in the category of combinatorial species is an operad in finite sets.

An operad in the above sense is sometimes thought of as a generalized ring. For example, Nikolai Durov defines his generalized rings as monoid objects in the monoidal category of endofunctors on  that commute with filtered colimits. This is a generalization of a ring since each ordinary ring R defines a monad  that sends a set X to the underlying set of the free R-module  generated by X.

Understanding the axioms

Associativity axiom
"Associativity" means that composition of operations is associative
(the function  is associative), analogous to the axiom in category theory that ; it does not mean that the operations themselves are associative as operations.
Compare with the associative operad, below.

Associativity in operad theory means that expressions can be written involving operations without ambiguity from the omitted compositions, just as associativity for operations allows products to be written without ambiguity from the omitted parentheses.

So that  may or may not be associative.

This is clearer when depicted as a tree:

which yields a 3-ary operation:

However, the expression  is a priori ambiguous:
it could mean , if the inner compositions are performed first, or it could mean ,
if the outer compositions are performed first (operations are read from right to left).
Writing , this is  versus . That is, the tree is missing "vertical parentheses":

If the top two rows of operations are composed first (puts an upward parenthesis at the  line; does the inner composition first), the following results:

which then evaluates unambiguously to yield a 4-ary operation.
As an annotated expression:

If the bottom two rows of operations are composed first (puts a downward parenthesis at the  line; does the outer composition first), following results:

which then evaluates unambiguously to yield a 4-ary operation:

The operad axiom of associativity is that these yield the same result, and thus that the expression  is unambiguous.

Identity axiom
The identity axiom (for a binary operation) can be visualized in a tree as:

meaning that the three operations obtained are equal: pre- or post- composing with the identity makes no difference. As for categories,  is a corollary of the identity axiom.

Examples

Endomorphism operad in sets and operad algebras 
The most basic operads are the ones given in the section on "Intuition", above. For any set , we obtain the endomorphism operad  consisting of all functions . These operads are important because they serve to define operad algebras. Intuitively, such a morphism turns each "abstract" operation of  into a "concrete" -ary operation on the set . An operad algebra over  thus consists of a set  together with concrete operations on  that follow the rules abstractely specified by the operad .

Endomorphism operad in vector spaces and operad algebras 
If k is a field, we can consider the category of finite-dimensional vector spaces over k; this becomes a monoidal category using the ordinary tensor product over k. We can then define endomorphism operads in this category, as follows.  Let V be a finite-dimensional vector space  The endomorphism operad  of V consists of
  = the space of linear maps ,

(Notice the analogy between operads&operad algebras and rings&modules: a module over a ring R is given by an abelian group M together with a ring homomorphism .)

Depending on applications, variations of the above are possible: for example, in algebraic topology, instead of vector spaces and tensor products between them, one uses (reasonable) topological spaces and cartesian products between them.

"Little something" operads
The little 2-disks operad is a topological operad where  consists of ordered lists of n disjoint disks inside the unit disk of  centered at the origin. The symmetric group acts on such configurations by permuting the list of little disks.

Originally the little n-cubes operad or the little intervals operad (initially called little n-cubes PROPs) was defined by Michael Boardman and Rainer Vogt in a similar way, in terms of configurations of disjoint axis-aligned n-dimensional hypercubes (n-dimensional intervals) inside the unit hypercube. Later it was generalized by May to the little convex bodies operad, and "little disks" is a case of "folklore" derived from the "little convex bodies".

Rooted trees 
In graph theory, rooted trees form a natural operad. Here,  is the set of all rooted trees with n leaves, where the leaves are numbered from 1 to n. The group  operates on this set by permuting the leaf labels.

Swiss-cheese operad

The Swiss-cheese operad is a two-colored topological operad defined in terms of configurations of disjoint n-dimensional disks inside a unit n-semidisk and n-dimensional semidisks, centered at the base of the unit semidisk and sitting inside of it. The operadic composition comes from gluing configurations of "little" disks inside the unit disk into the "little" disks in another unit semidisk and configurations of "little" disks and semidisks inside the unit semidisk into the other unit semidisk.

The Swiss-cheese operad was defined by Alexander A. Voronov. It was used by Maxim Kontsevich to formulate a Swiss-cheese version of Deligne's conjecture on Hochschild cohomology. Kontsevich's conjecture was proven partly by Po Hu, Igor Kriz, and Alexander A. Voronov and then fully by Justin Thomas.

Associative operad
Another class of examples of operads are those capturing the structures of algebraic structures, such as associative algebras, commutative algebras and Lie algebras. Each of these can be exhibited as a finitely presented operad, in each of these three generated by binary operations.

For example, the associative operad is a symmetric operad generated by a binary operation , subject only to the condition that

This associativity of the operation should not be confused with associativity of composition which holds in any operad; see the axiom of associativity, above.

In the associative operad, each  is given by the symmetric group , on which  acts by right multiplication.

The algebras over the associative operad are precisely the semigroups: sets together with a single binary associative operation. The k-linear algebras over the associative operad are precisely the associative k-algebras.

Terminal symmetric operad
The terminal symmetric operad is the operad which has a single n-ary operation for each n, with each  acting trivially. The algebras over this operad are the  commutative semigroups; the k-linear algebras are the commutative associative k-algebras.

Operads from the braid groups
Similarly, there is a non- operad for which each  is given by the Artin braid group . Moreover, this non- operad has the structure of a braided operad, which generalizes the notion of an operad from symmetric to braid groups.

Linear algebra
In linear algebra, real vector spaces can be considered to be algebras over the operad  of all linear combinations . The vector  for instance represents the operation of forming a linear combination with coefficients 2,3,-5,0,...

This point of view formalizes the notion that linear combinations are the most general sort of operation on a vector space – saying that a vector space is an algebra over the operad of linear combinations is precisely the statement that all possible algebraic operations in a vector space are linear combinations. The basic operations of vector addition and scalar multiplication are a generating set for the operad of all linear combinations, while the linear combinations operad canonically encodes all possible operations on a vector space.

Similarly, affine combinations, conical combinations, and convex combinations can be considered to correspond to the sub-operads where the terms of the vector  sum to 1, the terms are all non-negative, or both, respectively. Graphically, these are the infinite affine hyperplane, the infinite hyper-octant, and the infinite simplex. This formalizes what is meant by  being or the standard simplex being model spaces, and such observations as that every bounded convex polytope is the image of a simplex. Here suboperads correspond to more restricted operations and thus more general theories.

Commutative-ring operad and Lie operad 
The commutative-ring operad is an operad whose algebras are the commutative rings. A similar operad can be defined whose algebras are the associative, commutative algebras over some fixed base field. The Koszul-dual of this operad is the Lie operad (whose algebras are the Lie algebras), and vice versa.

Free Operads 
Typical algebraic constructions (e.g., free algebra construction) can be extended to operads. Let  denote the category whose objects are sets on which the group  acts. Then there is a forgetful functor , which simply forgets the operadic composition. It is possible to construct a left adjoint  to this forgetful functor (this is the usual definition of free functor). Given a collection of operations E,  is the free operad on E.

Like a group or a ring, the free construction allows to express an operad in terms of generators and relations.

Operads in homotopy theory 

In , Stasheff writes:
Operads are particularly important and useful in categories with a good notion of "homotopy", where they play a key role in organizing hierarchies of higher homotopies.

See also
 PRO (category theory)
 Algebra over an operad
 Higher-order operad
 E∞-operad
 Pseudoalgebra
 Multicategory

Notes

Citations

References

 
 

Miguel A. Mendéz (2015). Set Operads in Combinatorics and Computer Science. SpringerBriefs in Mathematics. .
Samuele Giraudo (2018). Nonsymmetric Operads in Combinatorics. Springer International Publishing. .

External links 
 
https://golem.ph.utexas.edu/category/2011/05/an_operadic_introduction_to_en.html

Abstract algebra
Category theory